This is a list of mosques in Kazakhstan.

See also
 Islam in Kazakhstan
 Lists of mosques

References

External links

 
Kazakhstan
Mosques